Helmholtzia is a small genus of flowering plants described in 1866. It includes species native to Australia (New South Wales and Queensland), Indonesia (Maluku Province), and New Guinea.

The genus was named for Hermann von Helmholtz, a German physician and physicist, by botanist Ferdinand von Mueller. 

 Species
 Helmholtzia acorifolia F.Muell. - NE Queensland
 Helmholtzia glaberrima (Hook.f.) Caruel - Mount Warning region in SE Queensland + NE New South Wales
 Helmholtzia novoguineensis (K.Krause) Skottsb. - New Guinea, Maluku

References

Commelinales genera
Philydraceae